Henry Wood was a 19th-century New York City minstrel show manager, known for creating Wood's Minstrels. The group performed at Mechanics' Hall (New York City), among other locales.

Wood's brother Fernando Wood was a mayor of New York City and served in the United States House of Representatives. Another brother, Benjamin Wood, also served in Congress and the New York State Senate.

References

Blackface minstrel managers and producers
Year of death missing